The National Museum in Poznań, Poland, abbreviated MNP, is a state-owned cultural institution and one of the largest museums in Poland. It houses a rich collection of Polish painting from the 16th century on, and a collection of foreign painting (Italian, Spanish, Dutch and German). The museum is also home to numismatic collections and a gallery of applied arts.

History
The National Museum in Poznań was established in 1857, as the "Museum of Polish and Slavic Antiquities". In 1894 the museum was renamed Provincial Museum of Posen. In 1902, the museum was renamed Kaiser-Friedrich-Museum. The current building was designed by Carl Hinckeldyen and built in 1904.

During World War II the building was damaged, the collection looted by German military, while numerous museum exhibits, including the natural and ethnographic collections, were destroyed. After the war the Polish Government retrieved many of the works taken by the Germans. At the turn of the 1960s and the 1970s the project of a new north wing of the museum was designed by architect Marian Trzaska. In the 1990s it was adapted by interior designer Witold Gyurkovich and opened to the public in 2001.

Branches
National Museum in Poznań and its branches:
National Museum, main building
Museum of Applied Arts
Museum of the History of Poznań
Military Museum of Wielkopolska
Museum of Musical Instruments
Ethnography Museum
 Rogalin Palace
Gołuchów Castle
Śmiełów Palace

Collections
Museum's collections are on display in seven thematic exhibition galleries that explore the major trends and disciplines of the age: the Gallery of Antiquity, the Middle Ages, Polish Art from the 16th to 18th century, and, in the new wing, the Gallery of Polish art from the period of foreign partitions until the end of World War II, the Gallery of European Art (or Foreign Painting), the Gallery of Modern Art, and the Poster and Graphic design Gallery. In 2006, the collections of the museum included 309 569 art objects in total as well as 4119 deposits.

The works of many prominent Polish artists are displayed in the Gallery of Polish Art, which includes paintings by Jan Matejko, Olga Boznańska, Jacek Malczewski, Stanisław Wyspiański, Leon Wyczółkowski, and Władysław Czachórski.

Gallery of Foreign Painting
The main building features one of the largest galleries of foreign painting in Poland, predominantly originating from the collection owned by Count Raczyński:

Gallery

Polish art

See also
 National Museum, Kraków
 National Museum, Warsaw
 National Museum, Wrocław
 List of registered museums in Poland

References

External links

 Official website
 National Museum in Poznań at culture.pl

Museums in Poznań
Buildings and structures in Poznań
Art museums established in 1857
1857 establishments in Prussia
Art museums and galleries in Poland
National museums of Poland
Registered museums in Poland
Tourist attractions in Poznań